Farrah Gray (born Farrakhan Khalid Muhammad) (Born September 9, 1984) is an American businessman, investor, author, columnist, and motivational speaker.

Gray was raised on Chicago's South side. He began his entrepreneurial career at the age of six selling homemade lotion and hand-painted rocks door-to-door.

Gray is the son of the late black nationalist leader Khalid Abdul Muhammad.

Honors
 The Network Journal Under-Forty Class Award (2008)
 The Urban Business Roundtable's Top 40 Game-Changers (2010)
 Famous Black Entrepreneurs list (#5) 
 Trumpet Award (2010)

Books

References

External links
Official website
CNN Up From a Past: African American Firsts" Farrah Gray feature
ABC 2020 America's Reallionaire Farrah Gray

Living people
21st-century American businesspeople
African-American investors
American investors
African-American non-fiction writers
American business writers
American publishing chief executives
American child businesspeople
American columnists
American finance and investment writers
American magazine publishers (people)
American motivational speakers
American motivational writers
American philanthropists
1984 births
21st-century African-American people
20th-century African-American people